The Hicacos Peninsula is a peninsula on Cuba's northern shore, in the province of Matanzas. The resort town of Varadero is located on the peninsula. The name comes from a species of cactus.

Geography
It is located between the Bay of Cárdenas and the Nicholas Channel of the Atlantic Ocean, and its extremity (Punta Hicacos) constitutes the northernmost point of the island of Cuba.

The cays developed off shore, such as Cayo Piedras and Cayo Cruz del Padre are the westernmost part of the Sabana-Camaguey Archipelago.

The Kawama navigation channel was opened between the Bay of Cardenas and the northern shore, to allow faster transit of ships from the port of Cárdenas to the northern shore, making a bridge the only access to the peninsula. The highway that crosses it and runs the length of Hicacos is the northern extremity of the Via Blanca highway, and it provides access to the resorts and marina located on the northern end.

Tourism

The white sand beaches that line the northern shore lead to the development of the resort town of Varadero close to the mainland, while the farther end is lined with all-inclusive resorts. The Josone Park sits between the two areas. A small marina and a dolphinarium are located on the south-eastern shore. The Hicacos Point Natural Park is a  ecological preserve established in 1974 on the north-eastern tip.

See also
Geography of Cuba

References

Geography of Matanzas Province
Peninsulas of Cuba
Beaches of Cuba
Tourist attractions in Matanzas Province